Balyk is a dried-fish product.

Balyk also may refer to:
 Balyk, bell of Great Lavra Belltower
 Bolshoy Balyk River in Khanty–Mansia

See also 
 Balik (disambiguation)